Annabeth is a female English given name created from a combination of the names Anna and Elizabeth. As it is a combination of two names, it has a combined meaning, which is favor, 'full of grace', and 'my God is an oath'.

People named Annabeth
People with the given name Annabeth include:
Annabeth Gish (born 1971), an American actress with starring roles in Shag, Mystic Pizza and Double Jeopardy
Annabeth Rosen (born 1957), an American sculptor and art studio faculty member at the University of California, Davis
Annabeth Barnes, an 11-year-old go-kart racer featured in the documentary film Racing Dreams
Annabeth Berkeley, a dancer with National Dance Company Wales
Annabeth Robinson, a Second Life digital performer who lectures at the Leeds College of Art

Characters named Annabeth
Fictional characters with the given name Annabeth include:
 Annabeth Chase, a daughter of Athena in Rick Riordan's Percy Jackson and the Olympians and one of the seven in the Heroes of Olympus
 Annabeth J'Amelia "A.J." Hazelwood, a character in Margaret Peterson Haddix's novel Turnabout
 Annabeth Lisbon, Teresa's niece in the television series The Mentalist, portrayed by Madison McLaughlin
 Annabeth Schott, a character on the political drama The West Wing, portrayed by Kristin Chenoweth
 Annabeth "Beth" Tezuka, a fictional character in the series Bravest Warriors.
Annabeth Nass, a character from "Hart of Dixie", portrayed by Kaitlyn Black

Annabeth Pearl, a character on “Law and Order SVU, Season 20 Episode 14”Part 33”.

See also

Anna
Beth
Annabel

References

English feminine given names